Muddumanigalu is an Indian Kannada language television drama series that airs on Star Suvarna and streams on the digital platform Disney+ Hotstar. It premiered on 22 January 2018. It is a remake of the Asianet's Malayalam series Karuthamuthu. From 24 January 2022 it started new season and rebranded as Muddumanigalu.

Series overview

Plot

Season 1 (Episode 1-1201) (2018-2021)
Muddulakshmi, a sweet and dark-skinned woman, endures prejudice because of her skin colour. Doctor Dhruvant, a cardiac surgeon, falls in love with her and they marry. Her mother-in-law, Soundarya, first opposes her, but she is eventually accepted. Meanwhile, Dhruvant's coworker Sharvari adores him and attempts to separate Dhruvant and Muddulakshmi so that she can marry him.
Muddulakshmi becomes pregnant shortly after, and Sharvari twists Dhruvant's mind by alleging that it is not his kid and that Muddulakshmi has had an affair. Dhruvant accepts this and begins to mistrust Muddulakshmi. He becomes enraged and confronts Muddulakshmi, leaving her and her family stunned and heartbroken. Dhruvant is sceptical of Muddulakshmi's claim that it is their child.
To maintain her dignity and self-respect, and for the sake of their relationship with the unborn kid. This causes Muddulakshmi to meet Dhruvant and his family, and Dhruvant and Muddulakshmi to frequently disagree. While Soundarya is determined to bring them together, Sharvari plans to keep them apart. 
After eight years, Shrishti and Drishti meet and become close, ignorant of their relationship. This causes Muddulakshmi to meet Dhruvant and his family, and Dhruvant and Muddulakshmi to frequently disagree. While Soundarya is determined to bring them together, Sharvari plans to keep them apart. The plot revolves around Muddulakshmi and Dhruvant reuniting after a DNA test reveals that Shrishti and Drishti are their offspring. But then they tear apart with a DNA test proven accordingly. Soundarya discloses that Dhristi is Sourya's twin sister, and that they are both Muddulakshmi and Dhruvant's offspring. Dhristi notices a lady fainting from thirst while driving. She assists the lady in getting 
home. She notices Sristhi's photo in the lady's residence and inquires about it, learning who she is. She believes she was adopted in this manner.
The climax depicts Dhruvant, Muddu, Shristi, and Dhriti taking a journey to Chikmagalur where they have fun while Hima is fascinated by driving a car. Shristi begins driving aggressively on a hill, and Muddu reluctantly joins the car in the absence of Dhruvant and Dhristi. Dhristi begins to worry after the automobile loses its equilibrium, and Karthik boards the vehicle to save his daughter and wife. Even though the danger has passed, his automobile collides with a rock and goes off the cliff, killing Dhruvant, Muddu, and Dhristi, while Shristi, the sole survivor, loses consciousness.

Season 2 (Episode 1201-present) (2022-present)

Cast 
 Ashwini as Muddulakshmi (2018–2022)
 Charith Balappa  as Cardiologist Dr. Dhruvant (2018–2021)
 Karthik Samag replaced Balappa in June 2021 (2021–2022)
 Archana Anantha as Soundarya
 Rakshit as Shivu
 Samishkaa as Drishti
 Shivani as Young Drishti (2019–2022)
 Aishwarya H as Srishti
 Lahari as Young Srishti
 Rakshith as Akul
 Anu Poovamma as Aishwarya
 Nandini Gowdah as Sharvari 
 Ananthavelu
 Vanishreee as Aishwarya's mother
 N.T. Ramaswamy as Aishwarya's father
 Mico Shivu
 Harish Babu
 Lakshmi Siddaiah

Production

Filming
Owing to the COVID-19 pandemic, the filming of all the Indian television series and films was suspended from 19 March 2020 and new episodes airing were stopped. The filming of the series resumed on 25 May 2020 and new episodes started to air from June 2020.

Casting
Archana Anantha who plays the role of Soundarya in Karuthamuthu's Telugu remake Karthika Deepam reprises the role in Muddulakshmi. In June 2021, lead Charith Balappa quit the series due to the COVID-19 pandemic and was replaced by Karthik Samag.

Crossover episodes
The series had a crossover with Billi Hendthi in June 2018, Premaloka in January 2020 and Sangarsha in September 2020, March 2021. In September 2018, it also had a crossover with the 3 serials Sarvamangala Mangalye, Shree and Krishna Tulasi in a special episode.

Adaptations

Reception
In week 42 of 2020, it received 3903 impressions gaining 4th position.

References 

2018 Indian television series debuts
Kannada-language television shows
Star Suvarna original programming